Gabriela Gajanová (born 12 October 1999) is a Slovak middle-distance runner specialising in the 800 metres. She won a bronze medal at the 2017 European U20 Championships.

International competitions

Personal bests
Outdoor
400 metres – 54.40 (Prague 2019)
600 metres – 1:27.40 (Göteborg 2022)
800 metres – 2:00.58 (Prague 2019)
1000 metres – 2:41.58 (Brno 2019)
1500 metres - 4:24.63 (Breclav 2021)
Indoor
800 metres – 2:04.02 (Stockholm 2023)
1500 metres - 4:25.88 (Bratislava 2020)

References

1999 births
Living people
Slovak female middle-distance runners
Sportspeople from Liptovský Mikuláš
Athletes (track and field) at the 2020 Summer Olympics
Olympic athletes of Slovakia
20th-century Slovak women
21st-century Slovak women